The Roman Catholic Archdiocese of Belém do Pará is an archdiocese located in the city of Belém in Brazil. The Archdiocese covers the municipalities of  Belém, Ananindeua, Benevides, Marituba, and Santa Bárbara do Pará.

History
 March 4, 1720: Established as Diocese of Belém do Pará from Diocese of São Luís do Maranhão
 May 1, 1906: Promoted as Metropolitan Archdiocese of Belém do Pará

Special churches
Minor Basilicas:
 Basilica of Our Lady of Nazareth of Exile (Basílica Santuário Nossa Senhora de Nazaré)
Cathedrals
 Our Lady of the Conception Cathedral, Abaetetuba (Catedral Nossa Senhora da Conceição)
 Our Lady of Grace Cathedral, Belém (Catedral Nossa Senhora das Graças)
Historic churches
 Church of Saint John the Baptist (Igreja de São João Batista)
 Church of Our Lady of the Rosary (Igreja de Nossa Senhora do Rosário)

Bishops
(all Roman Rite)

Episcopal ordinaries

Bishops of Belém do Pará 
 Bartolomeu do Pilar, OCarm (4 March 1720 – 9 April 1733)
 Guilherme de São José Antonio de Aranha (3 September 1738 – 18 May 1748)
 Miguel de Bulhões e Souza, OP (18 May 1748 – 24 March 1760)
 João de São José de Queiroz da Silveira, OSB (24 March 1760 – 25 November 1763)
 João Evangelista Pereira da Silva, TOR (17 June 1771 – 14 May 1782)
 Cayetano Da Annunciação Brandão, TOR (16 December 1782 – 29 March 1790), appointed Archbishop of Braga
 Manoel de Almeida de Carvalho (21 June 1790 – 30 June 1818)
 Romualdo de Souza Coelho (28 August 1820 – 15 February 1841)
 José Affonso de Moraes Torres, CM (22 January 1844 – 24 September 1857)
 Antônio de Macedo Costa (17 December 1860 – 26 June 1890), appointed Archbishop of São Salvador da Bahia
 Jerônimo Tomé da Silva (26 June 1890 – 12 September 1893), appointed Archbishop of São Salvador da Bahia
 Antônio Manoel de Castilho Brandão (7 September 1894 – 5 June 1901), Appointed Bishop of Alagôas
 Francisco do Rego Maia (5 June 1901 – 3 April 1906)
 José Marcondes Homem de Melo (26 April 1906 – 1 May 1906 see below)

Archbishops of Belém do Pará 
 José Marcondes Homem de Melo (see above 1 May 1906 – 6 December 1906)
 Santino Maria da Silva Coutinho (6 December 1906 – 19 January 1923), appointed Archbishop of Maceió, Alagoas 
 João Irineu Joffily (27 March 1924 – 1 May 1931)
 Antônio de Almeida Lustosa, SDB (10 July 1931 – 19 July 1941), appointed Archbishop of Fortaleza, Ceara 
 Jaime de Barros Câmara (15 September 1941 – 3 July 1943), appointed Archbishop of São Sebastião do Rio de Janeiro (Cardinal in 1946)
 Mário de Miranda Villas-Boas (10 September 1944 – 23 October 1956), appointed Coadjutor Archbishop of São Salvador da Bahia
 Alberto Gaudêncio Ramos (9 May 1957 – 4 July 1990)
 Vicente Joaquim Zico, CM (4 July 1990 – 13 October 2004)
 Orani João Tempesta, OCist (13 October 2004 – 19 April 2009), appointed Archbishop of São Sebastião do Rio de Janeiro (Cardinal in 2014)
 Alberto Taveira Corrêa (30 December 2009 - )

Coadjutor Bishops
Miguel de Bulhões e Souza, O.P. (1748)
Vicente Joaquim Zico, C.M. (1980-1990)

Auxiliary Bishops
Milton Corrêa Pereira (1962-1967), appointed Bishop of Garanhuns, Pernambuco
Tadeu Henrique (Jude) Prost, O.F.M. (1962-1992)
Alano Maria Pena, O.P. (1975-1976), appointed Coadjutor Prelate of Marabá, Para
Carlos Verzeletti (1996-2004), appointed Bishop of Castanhal, Para
Teodoro Mendes Tavares, C.S.Sp. (2011-2015), appointed Coadjutor Bishop of Ponta de Pedras, Para
Irineu Roman, C.S.I. (2014-2019), appointed Archbishop of Santarém, Para
Antônio de Assis Ribeiro, S.D.B. (2017-)

Other priest of this diocese who became bishop
Alberto Gaudêncio Ramos, appointed Bishop of Amazonas in 1948; later returned here as Archbishop

Suffragan dioceses
 Diocese of Abaetetuba
 Diocese of Bragança do Pará
Diocese of Cametá, formerly Territorial Prelature of Cametá
 Diocese of Castanhal
 Diocese of Macapá
 Diocese of Marabá
 Diocese of Ponta de Pedras
 Diocese of Santíssima Conceição do Araguaia
 Territorial Prelature of Marajó

Sources
 GCatholic.org
 Catholic Hierarchy
 Diocese website

Roman Catholic dioceses in Brazil
Belem do Para
 
Religious organizations established in the 1720s
Dioceses established in the 18th century